Seun Akindele  is a Nigerian actor.

Early life and education 
Akindele was born on October 7. Despite being a native of Ekiti State, Akindele grew up in Jos. He has a degree in history and international relations from Lagos State University.

Career 
Akindele acting career began in 2005 after participating at the Amstel Malta Box Office. At the 2011 Best of Nollywood Awards, Akindele won the award for "most promising actor" for the year in review. He was nominated for "best kiss in a movie" alongside Yvonne Jegede for their role in The Ex in 2015. He also got a "best supporting actor" nomination for Miss Taken.

Personal life 
Akindele married Toun in 2016.

Filmography 
 My Woman 2019 as Faisar
 Nation Under Siege
 Being Mrs Elliot
 Girls Are Not Smiling
 The Antique (film)
 The Banker (2015 film)
 The Department (film)
 Dazzling Mirage
 Heroes and Villains
 What Makes You Tick (2016) as Nosa Okojie

Awards and nominations

References

External links 
 

Living people
Year of birth missing (living people)
Male actors from Ekiti State
Actors from Jos
21st-century Nigerian male actors
Lagos State University alumni
Nigerian male film actors
Yoruba male actors
Nigerian male television actors
People from Ekiti State
Nigerian film award winners
Actors from Ekiti State